Ilya Ivanovich Alexeyev (born 18 July 1772; died 3 October 1830) was one of the commanders of the Russian Imperial Army during the Napoleonic Wars.

Biography 
Coming from the nobility of the province of Moscow, Ilya Ivanovich Alexeyev began his military career at the Preobrazhensky regiment. In October 1789, he took part as Sergeant in the Russo-Swedish War (1788–90), during which he was wounded twice. After the war, he was transferred to a regiment of horse guards. During the Russo-Turkish War of 1787-1792, he participated in the capture of Izmail (24 December 1790). After four years of service in the rank of Captain, it was incorporated into the regiment Horseman s-Soumskoï operating in Poland and was raised in 1796 to grade Major, cavalry inspector then aide of governor military Moscow.

On 9 August 1799 Ilya Alekseyev was elevated to the rank of colonel and soon after, he served as head of the Moscow police. After the transformation of Squadrons Moscow Police in Regiment Hussars Mitau, he was appointed the commander and took part in various battles on Prussian soil. He showed great bravery in the battles of Eylau, Guttstadt, the Heilsberg and Friedland. As a reward for his courage in battle on 24 May 1809, he was promoted to Major General.

In the Russo-Swedish War of 1808 - 1809, Major General ordered a vanguard detachment and he was decorated in 1809 to his exploits on the battlefield. He received the Order of St. Anna (1st class) - with golden sword and the inscription "For Valour"), and the Order of St. George (3rd class).

During the 1812 Patriotic War, he took part in the first Polotsk battle on 31 October 1812 and fought at the Battle of Chashniki, and the Battle of Smoliani.

Major General Alexeyev was seriously wounded in the leg during the German Campaign of 1813, the Battle of Lutzen. After his recovery, in August 1814, he was appointed commander of the 3rd division of dragoon and 30 August 1815 he distinguished himself at the siege of Metz, and was promoted to lieutenant-general, in recognition of the bravery he showed in battle.

Ilya Ivanovich Alekseyev died on 3 October 1830 and was buried at the Simonov Monastery in Moscow.

Sources
http://www.museum.ru/1812/persons/slovar/index.html

1772 births
1830 deaths
People from Ruzsky Uyezd
Russian nobility
Imperial Russian lieutenant generals
Russian military personnel of the Finnish War
Russian commanders of the Napoleonic Wars
Recipients of the Order of St. George of the Third Degree
Recipients of the Order of St. Vladimir, 2nd class
Recipients of the Order of St. Vladimir, 3rd class
Recipients of the Order of St. Anna, 1st class
Recipients of the Gold Sword for Bravery
Order of Saint Louis recipients